Leptospermum venustum is a species of spreading shrub that is endemic to Queensland. It has thin, rough, scaly bark, broadly elliptical leaves, deep pink flowers borne singly on side shoots and fruit that is fleshy and succulent at first.

Description
The bark is thin, rough, grey and scaly and the young stems are covered with spreading hairs. The petals are more or less round and there are thirty to forty stamens.

Taxonomy and naming
Leptospermum venustum was first formally described in 1992 by Anthony Bean in the journal Austrobaileya. The specific epithet (venustum) refers to "its very beautiful floral display".

Distribution and habitat
This tea-tree grows on hills and slopes, sometimes near small streams in woodland and is restricted to a small area west of Eidsvold.

Conservation status
This species is classified as "vulnerable" under the Queensland Government Nature Conservation Act 1992.

References

venustum
Myrtales of Australia
Flora of Queensland
Plants described in 1992